Robert Muse Bass (born 19 March 1948) is an American billionaire businessman and philanthropist. He was the chairman of Aerion Corporation, an American aerospace firm in Reno, Nevada. In 2018 he had a net worth of $5 billion. Bass has served on the Texas Highway & Public Transportation Commission.

Early life
Robert Muse Bass was born on 19 March 1948 in Fort Worth, Texas. His father, Perry Richardson Bass, was an investor, philanthropist and sailor. His mother, Nancy Lee Bass, was a philanthropist. He has three brothers: Lee Marshall Bass, Ed Bass, and Sid Bass. His uncle is Sid Richardson.

Bass attended Governor Dummer Academy, and graduated from Yale University, where he received a bachelor of arts degree. He received a master in business administration from the Stanford Graduate School of Business.

Career
Bass's father founded Bass Brothers Enterprises in 1960 after inheriting $11 million from his great uncle Sid W. Richardson in 1959.

In 1985, Robert Bass founded the Robert M. Bass Group as his personal investment company.  Bass also serves as president of Keystone, Inc. He founded Oak Hill Capital Partners in 1986.

In April 1987, Bass and other owners of TFBA Limited Partnership bought and took private Taft Broadcasting for $1.43 billion.

In March 1988, Bass sold the Plaza Hotel to Donald Trump, thanks to their mutual friend Tom Barrack.

In April 1988, he led a buy-out of Bell & Howell.

In June 1988, Bass made an offer to purchase Macmillan Inc., the publishing and information company, but the company responded with a restructuring.

Bass formerly served as Chairman of the board at Aerion Supersonic, a developer of supersonic business jets.  Bass was replaced by Tom Vice as Chairman upon the announcement of a partnership between Boeing and Aerion on February 5, 2019.

Philanthropy
Bass has served as chairman of Stanford University's board of trustees, Stanford Management Company, the National Trust for Historic Preservation, and Cook Children’s Medical Center . He is a trustee of Stanford University, a director of Stanford Management Company, a trustee of the Brookings Institution, a trustee of Rockefeller University, Groton School, Middlesex School, and the Amon Carter Museum.

Bass and his wife Anne donated $13 million to fund the renovation of Yale's Cross Campus Library, which was renamed the Bass Library. In 2005, they donated $30 million to the Stanford Graduate School of Business. In 2013, they donated $50 million to Duke University to support Bass Connections, an initiative to encourage cross-disciplinary collaboration and studies.  In 2001, Bass and his wife donated $10 million to Duke to strengthen undergraduate teaching. They also donated $10 million in 1996 to establish the Bass Society of Fellows at Duke. They also contributed to the creation of Bass Hall in Downtown Fort Worth (performing arts venue located in Fort Worth, Texas that routinely hosts musical and theatrical performances).

Personal life
Bass is married to Anne T. Bass. They have four children. One daughter, Margaret, was featured in a Wall Street Journal article as an example of a student whose wealth and family connections helped her receive admission to an elite university. They reside in the neighborhood Rivercrest in Fort Worth, Texas, and also have homes in New York City and in Washington, D.C. They also have a home in Seal Harbor on the southeast side of Mount Desert Island, Maine (south of Acadia National Park).

References

External links
Aerion Corporation
The Bass Brothers

1948 births
Living people
People from Fort Worth, Texas
American businesspeople
American billionaires
Yale University alumni
Benefactors of Yale University
Stanford University trustees
Private equity and venture capital investors
Corporate raiders
Bass family
People from Woodside, California
Stanford Graduate School of Business alumni
Brookings Institution people
The Governor's Academy alumni